The 1870 Mayo by-election was fought on 12 May 1870.  The by-election was fought due to the death of the incumbent Liberal MP George Henry Moore.  It was won by the unopposed Liberal candidate George Ekins Browne.

References

1870 elections in the United Kingdom
By-elections to the Parliament of the United Kingdom in County Mayo constituencies
Unopposed by-elections to the Parliament of the United Kingdom (need citation)
1870 elections in Ireland